M. S. Ramarao (3 July 1921 – 20 April 1992) was an Indian singer and composer. He was popular for his devotional songs.He was the very first play back singer in the Telugu filmdom.

Singing career
Rama Rao debuted at World Telugu Conference held in Hyderabad in 1975.

He became popular for his Telugu Version of Hanuman Chalisa. He also narrated Bala kanda,Ayodhya kanda and Sundara Kanda (some parts of the epic Ramayana) in form of Songs in Telugu. He gained fame for singing the devotional songs and was awarded the name of 'Sundara Dasu' in 1977.

He wrote Hanuman Chalisa and Sundarakandamu of Valmiki Ramayana in Telugu during 1972–74. He sang Sundarakanda in the form of Telugu songs.

Tollywood
His movie career as singer spanned 1944–64 in Madras.

He also sang " Ee vishala prashantha ekanta soudhamlo" for O. P. Nayyar's Telugu movie, Neerajanam.

Personal life
M.S.Rama Rao married Lakshmi Samrajyam in 1946 and had three children P.V.Sarojini Devi M.Babu Rao and M.Nageshwar Rao. 
He was inspired to write Hanuman chalisa because of his elder son Babu Rao who was a pilot in the Indian Air force whose whereabouts were not known for a long time during the Indo-Pak war in 1971, so he dedicated himself to lord Hanuman for his safe return and composed and sang the Hanuman chalisa in Telugu.
His only lineage to carry his surname is capt Moparti Anil Rao (grandson) and then his son Moparti Aman Rao (great-grandson). All of them being three generations of pilots. M.S.Rama Rao's second grandson is taking forward his legacy by continuing to perform his songs.

Awards
Rama Rao gained fame for his singing the above two works and was awarded the name of 'Sundara Dasu' in 1977.

Rao's inspirational songs still provide incentives to follow the path of singing, even a decade after his unfortunate death.

Songs
 Sundarakandamu
 Hanuman Chalisa
 Bala Kandamu

Filmography

References

External links
 Official site
 

1921 births
1992 deaths
People from Tenali
Telugu playback singers
20th-century Indian singers
Singers from Andhra Pradesh
Film musicians from Andhra Pradesh
Male actors from Andhra Pradesh
Male actors in Kannada cinema
Indian male film actors